The Ethics of Liberty is a 1982 book by American philosopher and economist Murray N. Rothbard, in which the author expounds a libertarian political position.

Hans-Hermann Hoppe's Introduction to the 1998 edition of the book claims that it "explains the integration of economics and ethics via the joint concept of property; and based on the concept of property, and in conjunction with a few general empirical (biological and physical) observations or assumptions, Rothbard deduces the corpus of libertarian law, from the law of appropriation to that of contracts and punishment." Rothbard's argument is based on a form of natural law ethics, and makes a case for anarcho-capitalism.

Summary

The Ethics of Liberty is divided into five parts, although a previous edition lacked the fifth. Part I is an introduction, which explains the outlines of natural law theory in general and defends it briefly against some objections. Part II is the substance of the work itself, setting forth Rothbard's ethics regarding the use of force. Part III applies his ethical theories to the State, which he viewed as "the inherent enemy of liberty and, indeed, of genuine law". Part IV offers brief reviews of alternative political theories developed by Mises, Hayek, Berlin, and Nozick. Part V attempts to set forth a theory of strategy of how to move from the present system to a libertarian anarcho-capitalist society.

Part I: Introduction: Natural Law 
Chapter 1, "Natural Law and Reason", defends natural law theory in general. Many modern political philosophers, according to Rothbard, reject the idea of natural law, dismissing it as a theological concept. Against them, Rothbard argues that natural law can be rationally established, without the need for theology. The Thomist tradition, for example, asserts the independence of philosophy from theology and the ability of man's reason to understand the laws of the natural order. Rothbard claims that this position is not anti-religious, as it leaves open the question of whether or not God has created that order or given man the ability to reason. He concludes by referencing Hugo Grotius and his successors, who elaborated an independent body of natural laws in order to construct a system of laws that would carry conviction in an age when theological controversy was losing its power.

Chapter 2, "Natural Law as 'Science'", argues that the concept of natural law is not mystical, but a scientific observation of entities and their behavior. If things have different attributes, they have different natures, which will cause a specific, definable result when they interact. In the case of man, if all things have natures, man's nature is also open to rational observation and reflection. The natural law ethic states that goodness or badness can be determined by what fulfills or thwarts what is best for man's nature. The natural law provides man with a "science of happiness," with the paths that lead to real happiness.

Chapter 3, "Natural Law versus Positive Law", compares natural law theory to legal positivism. The natural law is a set of ethical norms that are discovered by reason from the basic inclinations of human nature, while positive law is established by either following traditional customs, obeying the arbitrary will of those who rule the State apparatus, or using man's reason in discovering the natural law. The natural law provides an objective set of ethical norms that can potentially threaten the status quo and is considered the most appropriate way to establish positive law. However, the concept of natural law has been limited due to "widespread ignorance of and scorn", which has resulted in advocacy for legal structures based on traditional customs or arbitrary will. The chapter highlights how natural law theory has been erroneously used to defend the political status quo and how its radical and revolutionary implications were understood by Lord Acton, who considered it a matter of conscience and principle rather than might and expediency. The chapter also argues that natural law is not conservative as its principles are universal, fixed, and immutable, making it a mighty force for radical change.

Chapter 4, "Natural Law and Natural Rights", highlights that classical natural law theory identified the State as the major locus of virtuous action, whereas John Locke transformed classical natural law into a theory grounded on methodological individualism, leading to the conception of natural law in politics as establishing the natural rights of each individual. The chapter argues that natural rights stem from the nature of man and the world around him, and libertarian natural-rights theory continued to be expanded and purified after Locke, reaching its culmination in the nineteenth-century works of Herbert Spencer and Lysander Spooner. Overall, the chapter emphasizes the importance of individualism and natural rights in political philosophy.

Chapter 5, "The Task of Political Philosophy", argues that the major task of political philosophy is to construct a natural law ethic for the political scene, which includes the concept of natural rights and deals with violence and non-violence in interpersonal relations. Rothbard criticizes contemporary political scientists for neglecting this task and engaging in positivistic and empiricist approaches that lack explicit ethical judgments. He also criticizes present-day political philosophers for confining themselves to antiquarian descriptions and exegeses of past philosophers, rather than justifying value positions relevant to politics. Rothbard calls for a return to natural law and natural rights standards to establish a political philosophy of liberty and the proper sphere of law, property rights, and the state.

Part II: A Theory of Liberty 
Part II, "A Theory of Liberty", is "the substance of the work itself", and outlines Rothbard's ethical theories. It contains chapters 6 through 21. These chapters have been divided into subsections for the benefit of Wikipedia readers, although Rothbard did not do so.

Property, exchange, and aggression 
Chapter 6, "A Crusoe Social Philosophy", introduces the concept of "Crusoe Economics," which is the analysis of an isolated man in nature, and argues that it has an indispensable use in economics and social philosophy. Rothbard believes that by examining a man isolated from society and interactions with other people, the fundamental truths of human nature can be better understood. Crusoe's needs and desires must be fulfilled by transforming the natural world around him into capital and consumer goods through labor and reason. Rothbard argues that reason is unique to humans and is essential to survival and achievement. Crusoe's rationality leads him to learn about his ends and how to attain them, and he can do so through observation, abstraction, and thought.

Chapter 7, "Interpersonal Relations: Voluntary Exchange", explains that "the process of exchange enables man to ascend from primitive isolation to civilization", and that exchange is "made possible by two primordial facts of nature—natural laws—on which all of economic theory is based: (a) the great variety of skills and interests among individual persons; and (b) the variety of natural resources in geographic land areas." Additionally, Rothbard notes that exchange benefits both the weak and the strong, as it allows them to specialize and exchange for mutual benefit. Rothbard also explains that what is really being exchanged is not the commodities themselves, but the rights to ownership of them. Finally, he explains the importance of a generally accepted medium of exchange, or money, which is indispensable for any extensive network of exchange and hence for any civilized economy.

Rothbard explains that in a market economy, exchanges are not only "horizontal" but also "vertical," proceeding downward from the transformation of land, through various capital goods, and finally to consumption. He presents an example of a simple vertical pattern, where Smith sells an axe he made to Jones for a certain amount of gold, and Jones sells the lumber he cut with the axe to Johnson for gold. Rothbard then explains the role of intermediaries, such as Polk, in the exchange process. These intermediaries, or capitalists, hire laborers to transform and transport goods to a more useful place, and they pay them for their labor services. The capitalist's function is to save laborers from the necessity of restricting their consumption and waiting for their pay until the product is sold. By doing this, the capitalist confers a great benefit on the laborers, making possible the entire complex vertical network of exchanges in the modern economy. Rothbard argues that capitalists are not depriving the laborers of their rightful ownership of the product, but instead, they are making it possible for them to receive payment considerably in advance of the sale of the product. Finally, he states that each step of the way, a man produces by exerting his labor upon tangible goods, and the process of ownership ultimately derives from original production, voluntary exchange, and the hiring of labor services.

Chapter 8, "Interpersonal Relations: Ownership and Aggression", discusses the concept of interpersonal relations and how they can be peaceful or aggressive. Aggressive violence is when one person invades the property of another without the victim’s consent, whether that property is the person or tangible goods. Rothbard explores the two alternatives for a man's ownership rights to his own body: full self-ownership or the idea that each person should have only an equal part of ownership. The latter alternative leads to difficulties, since it's physically impossible for everyone to keep tabs on everyone else and to exercise an equal share of partial ownership over every other man. In practice, ownership of others necessarily becomes a specialized activity of a ruling class, and no society which does not have full self-ownership for everyone can enjoy a universal ethic. In contrast, the society of absolute self-ownership for all rests on the primordial fact of natural self-ownership by every man, and on the fact that each man may only live and prosper as he exercises his natural freedom of choice, adopts values, learns how to achieve them, etc.

Chapter 9, "Property and Criminality", defines a criminal as someone who uses violence against another person or their property. Rothbard raises the question: how can we know who is the rightful owner of property when we see an act of violence? For example, if we see A grabbing a watch from B, we cannot simply infer that A is a criminal and B is the innocent victim, as A may have been the rightful owner of the watch, and B may have stolen it from him. Therefore, we must investigate the particular case to determine who the legitimate property owner is. This means that we cannot simply talk about the defense of "property rights" or "private property" per se, as this may defend the property rights of a criminal aggressor. Instead, we must only speak of just or legitimate property. Rothbard also argues that the utilitarian way of looking at property rights and the free market is invalid, as it is blind to considerations of justice. Lastly, he discusses how Marxist and anarchosyndicalist arguments about the unjust ownership of property cannot be successfully countered by utilitarian arguments but must be dealt with by addressing the moral problem of the justice or injustice of various claims to property.

Rothbard believes that the concept of property ownership should be treated in terms of justice and injustice rather than utilitarian terms. The basic principle of property ownership is that all resources and goods that are in a state of no-ownership belong properly to the first person who finds and transforms them into a useful good. Existing property titles must be scrutinized to ensure that they were not criminally derived. If it is not possible to identify the victim or their heirs, and the current possessor is not the criminal who stole the property, then the title should remain with the current possessor. However, if the current possessor is the criminal who stole the property, then the criminal loses the property, and it reverts to a state of no-ownership. The first person who homesteads the property then becomes its legitimate owner.

Property in land 
Chapter 10, "The Problem of Land Theft", explains that land ownership poses unique challenges, because it is a fixed portion of the earth that endures virtually permanently. However, if the victims of theft are lost to antiquity, the land properly belongs to non-criminals who are in current possession. Another problem with land ownership is that land might never have been used and transformed, making any existing property title to the land invalid. Libertarian theory only validates ownership claims to land that has been transformed by human labor. If land has never been transformed, then no one can legitimately claim ownership. A claim to land that has never been put to use is invalid. The enforcement of such a claim against a first user would be an act of aggression against legitimate property rights. Another issue that arises in land ownership is adverse possession, where an individual assumes land is unowned, works it for a length of time, and the original owner appears and orders the individual's eviction. The common law of adverse possession sets a time span of 20 years, after which the intruder retains absolute ownership of the land, but libertarian theory holds that land needs only to be transformed once by man to pass into private ownership. Therefore, if the land bears the mark of a former human use, it is the individual's responsibility to assume that the land is owned by someone, and any intrusion upon the land without further inquiry is an act of aggression against legitimate property rights.

Chapter 11, "Land Monopoly, Past and Present", discusses the issue of land monopoly and its two forms: feudalism and land-engrossing. Feudalism is when landholders continue to aggress against peasants who work on the land, while land-engrossing is when arbitrary claims to virgin land are used to prevent first-transformers from accessing the land. Rothbard argues that both forms of land monopoly clash with the libertarian principle of non-ownership of land except by actual transformers. Land monopoly is a widespread problem in undeveloped countries, especially in Asia, the Middle East, and Latin America. However, the United States is one of the few countries that is virtually free from feudalism. American conservatives tend to overlook the land problem in undeveloped countries and only focus on promoting free market and private foreign investment. However, foreign investment based on land monopoly and aggression against peasants is similar to feudalism and must be dealt with in the same way. Rothbard provides examples of land aggression and monopoly in the modern world, including the Shah of Iran owning more than half of all arable land and a North American mining company in Peru encroaching upon and seizing the lands of neighboring Indian peasants.

The chapter explains that the answer to what our view should be towards investment in oil lands depends on the justice of the property title established in each specific case. Rothbard argues that if the oil company uses the government of the undeveloped country to grant it a monopoly concession to all the oil in a vast land area, thereby agreeing to the use of force to squeeze out all competing oil producers who might search for and drill oil in that area, then the company is illegitimately using the government to become a land-and-oil monopolist. Rothbard also argues that the current programs for "land reform" in the undeveloped countries are fallacious since it generally involves minor transfers of the least fertile land from landlords to peasants, which is unjust if the landlord's title is just. The chapter also discusses feudalism and its relationship with the strong state, and the errors in the dichotomy between feudalism and the strong central state.

Self-defense and punishment 
Chapter 12, "Self-Defense", argues that every person has the right to defend their justly-held property by violence against violent invasion, as well as the right to hire or accept the aid of others for such defending. However, defensive violence may only be used against an actual or directly threatened invasion of a person's property, including intimidation or fraud. The threat of aggression must be palpable, immediate, and direct, and the burden of proof that the aggression has begun must be on the person who employs the defensive violence. Rothbard also explains how fraud is implicit theft and fraudulent adulteration is equally implicit theft, both violating the right of free contract derived from the rights of private property.

Rothbard argues that inciting to riot is a pure exercise of a man’s right to speak without being implicated in crime, but if someone incites a riot while being involved in a criminal conspiracy, they would be just as responsible for the crimes committed as the other members. Rothbard also states that every man has the absolute right to bear arms for self-defense or any other licit purpose, and that the crime comes not from bearing arms but from using them for purposes of threatened or actual invasion.

Rothbard also asserts that the purpose of every judicial proceeding is to find who the criminal is or is not in any given case, but no force may be used against non-criminals. Rothbard argues that police may use coercive methods only if the suspect turns out to be guilty, and if not, then the police must be put into the dock for criminal assault. Police can never be allowed to commit an invasion that is worse than, or that is more than proportionate to, the crime under investigation. Finally, Rothbard argues that no man, in an attempt to exercise his right of self-defense, may coerce anyone else into defending him, as this would make the defender himself a criminal invader of the rights of others.

Chapter 13, "Punishment and Proportionality", discusses the libertarian theory of punishment. He emphasizes that punishment should be proportional to the crime committed and that the victim, not "society," should be the one to press charges against the wrongdoer. Proportionality sets the upper bound on punishment, but the plaintiff can forgive part or all of the penalty or allow the criminal to buy his way out of it. In cases of theft, the first part of punishment should be restitution, and if the criminal has already spent the money, they should be forced to work and allocate the ensuing income to the victim until they have been repaid. Rothbard criticizes current punishment practices, where the victim pays taxes to support the criminal in prison instead of receiving restitution.

Rothbard emphasizes that the idea of primacy for restitution to the victim as an ancient principle of law that has been lost as the state monopolized the institutions of justice. Rothbard provides examples of how restitution was the dominant concept of punishment in the Middle Ages, and the state gradually confiscated a greater proportion of the criminal's property for itself. Rothbard argues that restitution is not the complete criterion for punishment as it cannot be applied in cases of bodily assault. In such cases, the criminal must lose rights to the same extent as he has taken away. Rothbard concludes that proportionate punishment must be levied, which would include an additional compensation to the victim for the uncertain and fearful aspects of his ordeal. In the case of bodily assault, the victim has the right to beat up the criminal to rather more than the same extent. Finally, the author suggests that allowing the criminal to buy his way out of this punishment could enter only as a voluntary contract with the plaintiff.

Then, the concept of proportional punishment and retribution as a theory of punishment is discussed. Rothbard criticizes the view that retribution is a primitive and barbaric concept and points out the shortcomings of the modern theories of deterrence and rehabilitation. He argues that the deterrence principle implies punishments that most people would consider grossly unjust, while the rehabilitation principle leads to arbitrary and gross injustice and places enormous and arbitrary power to decide men’s fates in the hands of the dispensers of punishment. Rothbard suggests that proportional punishment is the only criterion for punishment that truly meets our conceptions of justice.

Abortion and the rights of children 
Chapter 14, "Children and Rights", examines the question of children's rights, and contains some of Rothbard's most controversial views. Rothbard establishes that every person has the right to own their own body and any virgin land they find or transform by labor, and this leads to a structure of property rights in all goods, including those obtained by exchange or gift. However, Rothbard argues that the issue of children's rights is more difficult because they are not natural self-owners like adults.

He starts by addressing the issue of abortion, and argues that a woman has the right to expel an unwanted fetus from her body, and any laws restricting or prohibiting abortion violate a woman's rights. Rothbard rejects the idea that a mother has contracted with the fetus by consenting to conception, and he argues that the fetus is a parasitic invader of the mother's body if she decides she does not want it there. He also dismisses the idea that the fetus is a human being with the right to life and points out that a born human does not have the right to be a coercive parasite within an unwilling human host. Rothbard concludes that the right to life is ambiguous, and any proper rights implied by advocates of the "right to life" are included in the concept of the right to self-ownership.

Rothbard argues that the parental jurisdiction over children should end when the child demonstrates their full rights of self-ownership by leaving or "running away" from home, regardless of age. This means that "we must grant to every child the absolute right to runaway and to find new foster parents who will voluntarily adopt him, or to try to exist on his own. Parents may try to persuade the runaway child to return, but it is totally impermissible enslavement and an aggression upon his right of self-ownership for them to use force to compel him to return."

Rothbard further argues that "if a parent may own his child (within the framework of non-aggression and runaway-freedom), then he may also transfer that ownership to someone else". This would allow for "a flourishing free market in children", where parents may sell the rights to their child in a voluntary contract. Rothbard explains that the government's prohibition on the sale of children at a price creates a monopolistic market for adoption agencies, resulting in "a large unsatisfied demand by adults and couples for children, along with a large number of surplus and unwanted babies neglected or maltreated by their parents. Allowing a free market in children would eliminate this imbalance, and would allow for an allocation of babies and children away from parents who dislike or do not care for their children, and toward foster parents who deeply desire such children." "In the libertarian society, then, the mother would have the absolute right to her own body and therefore to perform an abortion", and "parents would be able to sell their trustee-rights in children to anyone who wished to buy them at any mutually agreed price."

Then, Rothbard discusses the violation of the rights of parents and children by the State in the United States. Rothbard argues that the current state of juvenile law in the country is almost the reverse of the libertarian model, where the State systematically violates the rights of parents and children. According to him, the State seizes children from their parents on various grounds, including child neglect, which violates parental rights. He also explains how religious and personal morality have been dictated by the government. Rothbard then discusses how the rights of children have been systematically invaded by the State, including compulsory school attendance laws, which force children into public schools or private schools approved by the state. The author also argues that child labor laws have prevented children from entering the labor force, and they are often forced into schools that they dislike or are not suited for, leading to them becoming "truants." Finally, Rothbard notes that a significant percentage of juvenile delinquents incarcerated by the State did not commit acts that would be considered crimes if committed by adults.

The concept of human rights 
Chapter 15, "'Human Rights' As Property Rights", argues that the concept of "rights" makes sense only as property rights. Human rights, when not seen as property rights, turn out to be vague and contradictory, leading to their weakening on behalf of "public policy" or the "public good." Rothbard provides an example of free speech, where there is no such thing as a separate "right to free speech"; there is only a man's property right: the right to do as he wills with his own or to make voluntary agreements with other property owners. He argues that couching the analysis in terms of a "right to free speech" instead of property rights leads to confusion and the weakening of the very concept of rights. He also argues that the most famous example of shouting "Fire" falsely in a crowded theater implies no need for the law to weaken the absolute nature of rights when analyzed in terms of property rights. The author concludes that human rights and property rights are identical and that human rights lose their absoluteness and clarity when property rights are not used as the standard.

Then, Rothbard explores the allocation of scarce resources like time and space, such as in assembly halls or newspapers. He argues that, instead of relying on vague concepts of free speech and assembly rights, it is more appropriate to frame these rights in terms of private property. He suggests that the owner of the resource, whether it be a radio producer or a newspaper editor, has the right to allocate it as they see fit. In cases where there is a shortage of a resource, the allocation could be done through price systems. The right to free speech and assembly should be understood as part of a person's general right to their property, including their right to make mutually agreed-upon contracts and exchanges with the owners of other properties. The solution is to focus on the right of private property and recognize that the right to free speech is simply a subdivision of property rights.

Rothbard says that "in general, those problems where rights seem to require weakening are ones where the locus of ownership is not precisely defined, in short where property rights are muddled", and street or governmental assemblies become a source of conflict. Rothbard states that in a libertarian society, streets and government assemblies would be privately owned and the problem of allocation of scarce resources would be resolved without violating anyone's property rights. The conflict between residents and businesses, such as McDonald's, could also be resolved, and street-owners would have the right to decide who would have access to those streets, keeping out "undesirables" if they so wished.

Views on intellectual property 
Chapter 16, "Knowledge, True and False", discusses the property rights theory and how it can help to solve issues relating to knowledge dissemination. He poses a question whether a person, Smith, has the right to print and distribute statements about another person, Jones, such as "Jones is a liar," "Jones is a convicted thief," or "Jones is a homosexual." There are three possibilities about the truth of such a statement: that it is true, false, or that the truth or falsity of the statement is a gray area. If the statement is definitely true, then Smith has a right to print and disseminate it. It is also Jones' right to rebut the statement. The current libel laws make Smith's action illegal if done with "malicious" intent, even if the information is true. However, legality or illegality should depend not on the motivation of the actor, but on the objective nature of the act.

Rothbard argues that there is no such thing as a right to privacy, except the right to protect one's property from invasion. The only proper course is to maintain that no one has any spurious "right to privacy," or right not to be mentioned publicly; while everyone has the right to protect his property against invasion. No one can have a property right in the knowledge in someone else’s head. Rothbard also argues that there is no "right to know," and there is only the right of the knower to either disseminate his knowledge or to keep silent. No particular profession, such as newspapermen, lawyers, doctors, priests, and psychoanalysts, has any special "privileges" of confidentiality allegedly accruing to them. Finally, he argues that everyone has the same right in his person and in the goods that he finds, inherits, or buys, and it is illegitimate to make distinctions in property right between one group of people and another.

Rothbard discusses the right to protect sources of information, and argues that everyone should have the right to be silent or protect their sources in court or elsewhere, so that compulsory testimony is wrong. However, there is an exception to the right to use and disseminate knowledge within one's head, if it was procured from someone else as conditional rather than absolute ownership. Rothbard also discusses the inviolability of contractual copyright and explains that a violation of such copyright is an equivalent violation of contract and theft of property. Furthermore, no one can acquire a greater property title in something than has already been given away or sold. For instance, Brown may retain the right to sell his design of mousetraps, and sell to Green only the right to use the mousetraps, but not to sell them. So, if Green or anyone else were to sell that design of mousetraps, it would be a violation of Brown's property rights and prosecutable as theft. Rothbard acknowledges that there may be difficulties in enforcing property rights in some cases, particularly when products are easier to replicate.

Rothbard also defends the right to blackmail, arguing that the right to disseminate or not disseminate knowledge is derived from the general property right in one's person and knowledge. As such, one has the right to receive payment in exchange for not disseminating such knowledge. If blackmail were illegal, it would encourage people to disseminate derogatory information. Rothbard argues that the vilification suffered by the blackmailer is unjustified compared to the gossip or blabbermouth, who is usually dismissed with slight contempt. Rothbard poses questions about the outlawry of blackmail contracts, such as whether it should be illegal for Jones to offer to purchase Smith's silence, and whether it should be illegal for Smith to let Jones know he has the information and intends to publish it.

Bribery, boycotts, and contracts 
Chapter 17, "Bribery", argues that there is nothing inherently wrong with the act of giving a bribe, as it is simply a way to lower prices and gain contracts. The real problem lies with the person receiving the bribe, who is violating their contractual obligation to act in the best interest of their employer. Therefore, only the taker of a bribe should be prosecuted, not the giver. This applies to situations such as payola and plugola, where a bribe is given to influence the playing or advertising of certain products. The violator of property rights in these situations is the person who accepts the bribe, not the person who gives it.

Chapter 18, "The Boycott", discusses the legitimacy of boycotts in a free society. A boycott is an attempt to persuade people to not have any association with a particular person or firm, either socially or commercially. From a libertarian perspective, boycotts are legal and licit because they are purely voluntary and an exercise of free speech and property rights. It is within the rights of those who disagree with a boycott to organize a counter-boycott or to boycott the boycotters. Secondary boycotts, where labor unions attempt to persuade consumers not to buy from firms that deal with non-union firms, are also legitimate, despite their outlawry under current labor laws. The use of picketing as a form of advertising a boycott is a more complex issue because it involves the use of government streets. In a free society, employer devices such as the blacklist and yellow-dog contract would be legal.

Chapter 19, "Property Rights and the Theory of Contracts", argues that the right to make contracts derives from the right of private property. Therefore, only enforceable contracts should be those where the failure of one party to abide by the contract implies the theft of property from the other party. The proper libertarian theory of enforceable contracts, according to Rothbard, is what he calls the "title-transfer" theory of contracts. Rothbard argues that mere promises are not a transfer of property title, and the failure to fulfill a contract is an implicit theft of property. He also argues against the prevalent “promise” or “expectations” theory of contracts, which holds that all promises must be enforceable contracts. Rothbard contends that there can be no property in someone's promises or expectations and therefore should not be enforceable. Rothbard argues that a person cannot alienate their will or control over their own mind and body, and these things are inalienable.

Rothbard argues that prohibiting someone from working for another employer for a certain period is one step removed from direct compulsory slavery and should be impermissible in a libertarian society. However, employers can voluntarily agree to blacklist the worker and refuse to employ him. Rothbard also explains that if an individual receives payment or a loan based on their future service, and they decide to quit, they must return the payment or loan amount plus interest, as the title to the money was transferred conditionally on their performance. Rothbard also discusses the case of a movie actor who fails to appear at a certain theater at a certain date and concludes that the theater owners cannot force the actor to recompense them for the publicity and expenses incurred in anticipation of his appearance. However, if the actor received an advance payment from the theater owners, he must return it. Rothbard proposes that a solution to these issues is to require a performance bond in the original agreement, which evolved as a voluntary penalty or penal bond during the Middle Ages and the early modern period.

Then, Rothbard discusses the enforceability of gift-contracts. If title to alienable property has been transferred, the agreement is enforceable because a failure to deliver the transferred property is theft. But if it is a mere promise that has not transferred title to property, it may be morally binding but cannot be legally binding on the promissor. The chapter applies these theories to a pure gift agreement, and the author concludes that the grandson has no right to the grandfather's property unless the grandfather transferred title. The chapter also states that fraud would be legally actionable as it is a failure to fulfill a voluntarily agreed upon transfer of property and is implicit theft.

Finally, Rothbard discusses voluntary forgiveness of debts, which is a legitimate way of dealing with the problem of defaulting debtors. He highlights that in a libertarian system that defends property rights, each creditor may forgive only his own debt and there can be no legal situation in which a majority of creditors compel a minority to forgive their claims. Forgiveness of debts may occur after the fact of default or be incorporated into the original debt contract, which takes on the legal-philosophical status of a gift by the creditor to the debtor. Rothbard also asserts that a person should be able to sell not only the full title of ownership to property but also part of that property, retaining the rest for himself or others. He also rules out entail as an enforceable right, stating that property rights must only be accorded to and can only be enjoyed by the living. Finally, he argues that the title-transfer theory immediately tosses out of court all variants of the "social contract" theory as a justification for the State.

"Lifeboat" situations, and animal rights 
Chapter 20, "Lifeboat Situations", discusses the issue of "lifeboat" situations where the concept of absolute property rights or any rights of self-ownership may be challenged. In a lifeboat scenario where there are only eight places available but more than eight people who want to be saved, the question arises as to who should be saved and who should die. Some argue that any theory of rights breaks down in such situations, and therefore, there can be no concept of inviolable rights. However, Rothbard suggests that lifeboat situations are hardly valid tests of moral theories or theories of rights. Any moral theory is framed based on normal nature, and not on rare or extreme situations. The law also recognizes that "hard cases make bad law." Rothbard argues that property rights may still be applicable in a lifeboat situation if the owner of the boat or his representative has died, and no rules have been laid down for allocation of seats in such a crisis. The homesteading principle can then be applied, and the first eight people to reach the boat can be considered the proper "owners" and users of the boat. Anyone who throws them out of the boat violates the property right of the "homesteader" and becomes liable for prosecution for his act of aggression as well as perhaps murder. Rothbard argues that any other principle of allocation would be truly intolerable, and "women and children first" is morally unacceptable.

Chapter 21, "The 'Rights' of Animals", argues against extending the concept of rights to animals. Rothbard asserts that the notion of human rights is not an emotional one, but a result of a rational inquiry into the nature of man and the universe. The ability to reason, make conscious choices, and participate in the division of labor are unique to humans, and thus, only humans possess natural rights. Rothbard also argues that the concept of natural rights is relative to the species man and that animals cannot be said to have rights because they cannot petition for them. Rothbard concludes that any concept of rights, criminality, or aggression can only apply to actions of one human being or group of human beings against other human beings.

Part III: The State Versus Liberty 
Chapter 22, "The Nature of the State", argues that while the State performs many necessary functions, such as providing law and maintaining public services, this does not demonstrate that only the State can perform these functions or that it performs them efficiently. He uses the example of a coercive monopolist to show that when protected from competition by force, the quality of services will tend to decline, and consumers will be deprived of alternative choices. The State has gained a monopoly of the commanding heights of the economy and society, including police and military services, provision of law, judicial decision-making, the mint, the power to create money, and the means of delivering mail. The State relies on control of propaganda and the use of violence to maintain its power. Rothbard argues that taxation is theft, as it is the compulsory seizure of property of the State's inhabitants, or subjects, through coercion.

Then, Rothbard refutes the argument that voting in democratic governments makes the government and all its works and powers truly voluntary. Rothbard argues that even if the majority of people endorsed every act of the government, this would be majority tyranny, not voluntary action. Voting can hardly establish "majority" rule, much less the voluntary consent of all. Furthermore, taxes are levied on everyone regardless of whether they voted or not, so voting cannot indicate any sort of endorsement of the government's actions. Rothbard also discusses Lysander Spooner's view that elected officials are not truly representatives of the people, and that voting does not establish any sort of voluntary consent to the government. Rothbard concludes that the State, which subsists on taxation, is a vast criminal organization far more successful than any "private" Mafia in history.

Finally, Rothbard explains the necessity of ideology for the State and how it has always been used to convince the majority of the public to support the State. Rothbard argues that the State needs to employ ideologists to convince the public that what the State does is necessary and vital. The support of the majority is necessary for the continued existence of the State, and this support can be passive resignation or active enthusiasm. The State's age-old alliance with intellectuals, who weave the apologia for State rule, is also explained. The State controls education on the lower levels through the public school system, certification requirements for private schools, and compulsory attendance laws. In addition, the State has virtually total control over radio and television. Rothbard concludes that the State needs the intellectuals to provide them with power, status, and wealth that they cannot obtain in voluntary exchange.

Chapter 23, "The Inner Contradictions of the State", argues that the State's existence is often taken for granted as an evil but inescapable force of nature, but by considering the theoretical "state of nature," we can see the absurdity of the argument for the State. Limited government is seen as "unrealistic and inconsistent", as there is no reason to assume that a monopoly of violence will remain "limited." The ruling caste will try to expand their power and wealth by stretching State power beyond limits and encountering only weak opposition. There are no institutional mechanisms to keep the State limited, and any power once acquired will be used and abused. Additionally, "there is a grave inner contradiction inherent in the very ideal of a neutral or impartial State", as "the very existence of taxation negates any possibility of such neutrality", creating two antagonistic social classes.

Rothbard argues that the State is not necessary for the creation and development of law, as most law, particularly the libertarian parts, emerged from non-State institutions. These non-State institutions, such as tribal customs and common-law judges, "were not engaged in making law, but in finding the law in existing and generally accepted principles, and then applying that law to specific cases or to new technological or institutional conditions." Rothbard also examines the concept of limited government and notes its inconsistencies, particularly its failure to recognize that "the State, by its very nature, cannot obey its own legal rules." Randy Barnett suggests that the State-made law is sui generis, and not true reciprocity because the State violates its own laws by using its power to tax and its monopoly on defense. If the lawmaking body cannot follow all of its rules, procedural and substantive, it is not a legal system, and its acts are outside the law.

Chapter 24, "The Moral Status of Relations to the State", argues that the State is a criminal organization that institutionalizes crime and aggression, and therefore it cannot possess any just property. This means that it is morally permissible to refuse to obey the State, appropriate its property, or break contracts with it. However, he acknowledges that these actions may not always be prudent given the State's prevailing power.

Rothbard discusses the problem of default or repudiation of government debt, arguing that government debt cannot be considered a legitimate contract as it coerces taxpayers into paying bondholders. He suggests that the bondholder, in fact, appears in a different moral light as someone who invests in future robbery.

He also examines the problem of breaking contracts with the State, suggesting that in a free society, it would be legitimate to resign from an army despite signing a voluntary contract for a longer term of enlistment. However, in a State army, it would be morally permissible to leave the State's army at any time, regardless of the terms of enlistment.

Finally, he distinguishes between "aggressive" and "defensive" bribery of government officials, arguing that aggressive bribery is illegitimate, but defensive bribery is justified as a means of protection against aggression by the State.

Chapter 25, "On Relations Between States", discusses the moral principles that libertarianism can provide as criteria for foreign policy. In a stateless world, it is legitimate for an individual to use defensive violence against an aggressor, but not against innocent third parties. The same holds true in a war between two groups of individuals. Aggression against innocent people is a criminal act that must be repelled by violence if necessary. However, modern weapons of mass murder, such as nuclear weapons, cannot be pinpointed against actual criminals, making it a difference in kind from earlier weapons.

Rothbard argues that wars between states are uniquely characterized by inter-territoriality and increased aggression against the state's own taxpayers. This is because state wars can only be funded through aggression against the taxpayer. Furthermore, while some revolutions and private conflicts may be legitimate, state wars are always to be condemned as they involve increased aggression against the state's own taxpayers and almost always involve the maximum aggression against innocent civilians ruled by the enemy state. The libertarian's objective, therefore, should be to pressure states not to launch wars against other states and to negotiate peace treaties as quickly as possible. Finally, the laws of war and neutrality were designed to limit the invasion of the rights of the civilians of the respective warring countries and to keep the war strictly confined to the warring states themselves.

Part IV: Modern Alternative Theories of Liberty 
Part IV is "a discussion and critique of several leading alternative theories of liberty brought forth in the modern world, by those who are very roughly in the free-market, or classical liberal, tradition."

Chapter 26, "Utilitarian Free-Market Economics", is the only chapter divided into subsections, viz., "Introduction: Utilitarian Social Philosophy", "The Unanimity and Compensation Principles", and "Ludwig von Mises and "Value-Free" Laissez Faire".

Section A, "Introduction: Utilitarian Social Philosophy", critiques the use of utilitarianism as a foundation for a libertarian or laissez-faire political philosophy. Utilitarianism, which holds that the "good" policy is the one that yields the "greatest good for the greatest number," is criticized for several reasons. First, it is unclear why the happiness of the majority should be more important than the happiness of the minority. Second, the idea that each person should count for one is an unexamined assumption. Third, the assumption that individual desires and values are absolute and unchanging is problematic, as experience and moral persuasion can cause individuals to change their values. Additionally, economics correctly informs us that utilities and costs are subjective and ordinal, making it illegitimate to add or weight them to arrive at any estimate for "social" utility or cost.

Section B, "The Unanimity and Compensation Principles", explores the Unanimity Principle, a variant of Pareto optimality, which suggests that a political policy is good if one or more people are better off, while no one is worse off. Rothbard argues that this principle is flawed because it depends on the goodness of justice of the existing situation. The Compensation Principle is another variant of Pareto optimality, which suggests that a public policy is good if the gainers from that policy can compensate the losers and still enjoy net gains. However, it is flawed because it assumes that it is possible to add and subtract utilities interpersonally, and each individual’s gains and losses can be precisely estimated, which is not the case. The author concludes that in advocating public policy, it is essential to have some ethical system or concept of justice.

Section C, "Ludwig von Mises and 'Value-Free' Laissez Faire", discusses Ludwig von Mises' position on the matter of praxeology, value-judgments, and the advocacy of public policy. Mises was an uncompromising adherent of laissez-faire and a rigorous and uncompromising advocate of value-free economics, but he attempted to reconcile these two positions in two different ways. The first solution is a variant of the Unanimity Principle, which affirms that an economist cannot say a governmental policy is "good" or "bad." However, if the consequences of the policy are agreed to be bad by all its supporters, then the economist can call it a "bad" policy. But this attempt fails as Mises can't know the value-scales of the advocates of the policy. The economist knows the scale of values only through the reality of action. Furthermore, most of the consequences of a policy take time, and people may refuse to change their minds, even after acknowledging the praxeological chain of consequences.

Rothbard critiques the idea that praxeology (the study of human action) can prove that laissez-faire policies will lead to prosperity and abundance, and government intervention will lead to conflict and impoverishment. While this may be true for most people, it is not the case for all. For example, some people may prioritize equality of income, even if it means sacrificing wealth and efficient production. Rothbard argues that this competing value cannot be criticized by utilitarian economists, as they must favor the majority achieving their chosen goals. Additionally, some types of statist intervention may have little or no cumulative effect and may even have very little impact on prosperity. Therefore, the argument that intervention will eventually lead to socialism is not entirely satisfactory.

Chapter 27, "Isaiah Berlin on Negative Freedom", critiques Sir Isaiah Berlin's concept of negative liberty, which is defined as the absence of interference with a person's sphere of action. Rothbard argues that Berlin's vague definition led to confusion and the absence of a systematic and valid libertarian creed. Berlin's original concept of negative liberty is flawed because "a man can be held to be 'free' in proportion as his wants and desires are extinguished, for example by external conditioning". Later, Berlin defines freedom as "the absence of obstacles to possible choices and activities." However, this comes close to confusing "freedom" with "opportunity" and "to scuttling Berlin’s own concept of negative freedom and replacing it with the illegitimate concept of 'positive freedom.'" "Berlin's fundamental flaw was his failure to define negative liberty as the absence of physical interference with an individual’s person and property, with his just property rights broadly defined." Rothbard also argues that Berlin's "assaults on laissez-faire as somehow injurious to negative liberty" are absurd and self-contradictory. "Berlin is really explicitly scuttling the very concept of 'negative' liberty on behalf of concepts of positive power or wealth."

Chapter 28, "F.A. Hayek and The Concept of Coercion", critiques F.A. Hayek's political philosophy on individual liberty, specifically his flawed definition of coercion as including both physical violence and peaceful, non-invasive actions. Rothbard argues that this leads to confusion and self-contradiction in Hayek's arguments, and fails to distinguish between aggressive and defensive coercion or violence. Rothbard argues that Hayek's justification for the state’s existence, as well as its employment of taxation and other measures of aggressive violence, rests upon "his untenable obliteration of the distinction between aggressive and defensive violence". 

Chapter 29, "Robert Nozick and the Immaculate Conception of the State", critiques Robert Nozick's book Anarchy, State, and Utopia. Rothbard argues that Nozick's book is a variant of a Lockean contractarian attempt to justify the State, but finds several fallacies in Nozick's conception. Rothbard criticizes Nozick's argument that a dominant protection agency would emerge in an anarchic society, and argues that allowing coercive action against "risky" activities creates a slippery slope that leads to tyranny and totalitarianism. Rothbard continues his critique of Nozick's views on compensation, blackmail, and procedural rights, and finally suggests, with the help of a quotation from Roy Childs, that Nozick's minimal state would ultimately lead to anarchy.

Part V: Toward a Theory of Strategy for Liberty 
Chapter 30, "Toward a Theory of Strategy for Liberty", argues that the quest to achieve liberty should be motivated by a conception of natural-rights justice, rather than utility. Rothbard discusses the strategic stance that a libertarian should take in a world where states still exist, and how to push society towards greater liberty. He argues that while the ultimate goal of the libertarian is the immediate abolition of the state as an organized engine of aggression, transitional demands and steps towards liberty in practice are necessary. However, these transitional demands should never contradict the ultimate goal of liberty. For example, a demand for a 10% reduction in the government budget each year for ten years, after which the government will disappear, may have heuristic or strategic value, but it should never imply that any faster pace towards cutting the budget would be wrong. Similarly, the idea of a comprehensive planned program towards liberty is flawed, as it implies that the state is not the enemy of mankind and that it is desirable to use the state to engineer a measured pace towards liberty. The insight that the state is the permanent enemy of mankind leads to a different strategic outlook, where libertarians push for and accept any reduction of state power or activity on any front. Rothbard argues that the reduction or abolition of a tax is always a non-contradictory reduction of state power and a step towards liberty, but its replacement by a new or increased tax elsewhere does just the opposite, for it signifies a new and additional imposition of the state on some other front. The imposition of a new tax is a means that contradicts the libertarian goal itself. Finally, Rothbard states that while the libertarian may set priorities and concentrate his energy on political issues that he deems most important, he must use his strategic intelligence and knowledge of the issues of the day to set his priorities of political importance.

According to Rothbard, "the victory of total liberty is the highest political end", and "should be pursued by the speediest and most efficacious possible means". Education is a necessary condition for the victory of liberty and there must be an active and self-conscious libertarian movement. The existence of professionals, of persons making their full-time career in the movement or discipline in question, is also necessary. It is not undemocratic to have a vanguard group of libertarians that can help to bring about a majority or a large and influential minority of people adhering to libertarian ideology. The adoption of libertarianism can be thought of as a ladder or pyramid, with various individuals and groups on different rungs. The libertarian can engage in coalitions with non-libertarians around the advancement of some single, ad hoc activity to "accomplish a twofold purpose: (a) greatly multiplying his own leverage or influence in working toward a specific libertarian goal—since many non-libertarians are mobilized to cooperate in such actions; and (b) to 'raise the consciousness' of his coalition colleagues, to show them that libertarianism is a single interconnected system, and that a full pursuit of their particular goal requires the adoption of the entire libertarian schema."

Rothbard explains that in the process of social change, two types of deviations can arise, which the Marxists have called "right opportunism" and "left sectarianism". Right opportunism is willing to abandon the ultimate social goal in pursuit of short-term gains, while left sectarianism sees immorality and betrayal in using strategic intelligence to pursue transitional demands. Both deviations are destructive and equally destructive of the task of achieving the ultimate social goal. "The Marxists have correctly perceived that two sets of conditions are necessary for the victory of any program of radical social change; what they call the 'objective' and the 'subjective' conditions." The subjective conditions are the existence of a self-conscious movement dedicated to the particular social ideal, and the objective conditions are a perceived crisis breakdown of the existing system. The revolution in any modern society has been utilized by an existing cadre of ideologists of the alternative system and precipitated by a breakdown of the system itself.

Finally, Rothbard argues that there are good reasons for libertarians to be optimistic in both the short and long term. In the long run, Rothbard believes that the triumph of a free-market economy and an end to statism is inevitable because a "modern industrial economy requires a vast network of free-market exchanges and a division of labor, a network that can only flourish under freedom." In the short term, Rothbard says that "the various forms of statism imposed on the Western world during the first half of the twentieth century are now in process of imminent breakdown." "Surprisingly enough, the systemic breakdown of statism in the United States can be given a virtually precise date: the years 1973–74. The breakdown has been particularly glaring in the economic sphere."

Reception

Reception of the book has been positive in libertarian circles. Many praise the book for its incisive analysis of natural law and its practical applications. Libertarian commentator Sheldon Richman says: "The Ethics of Liberty is a great book that deserves the attention of anyone interested in the good society and human flourishing."

The economist Hans-Hermann Hoppe, in his Introduction to the work, described The Ethics of Liberty as Murray Rothbard's second magnum opus, the other being Man, Economy, and State (1962).

The philosopher Matt Zwolinski criticized the book, writing that Rothbard's discussion of self-ownership in chapter six "rests on a fundamental confusion between descriptive and normative claims."

Release history
 New York University Press. New York, 2003. Paperback. .
 New York University Press. New York, 1998. Hardcover. .
With a new introduction by Hans-Herman Hoppe. Audiobook / full text available.
 Humanities Press. Atlantic Highlands, NJ: 1982. Hardcover. .

References

External links

 Full text at the Mises Institute
 Full audiobook at the Mises Institute

1982 non-fiction books
Books about capitalism
Books by Murray Rothbard
English-language books
Ethics books
Libertarianism in the United States
New York University Press books
Political manifestos
Political philosophy literature